Ernest Albert Garlington (February 20, 1853 – October 16, 1934) was a United States Army general who received the Medal of Honor during the Indian Wars.

Early life and education
Garlington was born in Newberry, South Carolina to Albert Creswell Garlington, a general in the South Carolina militia during the American Civil War. He entered the University of Georgia (UGA) in Athens in 1869; however, he left UGA before graduating to accept an appointment to the United States Military Academy. He graduated from the academy in 1876 and was commissioned on June 15 of that year as a second lieutenant in the 7th Regiment of the United States Cavalry, but he did not physically join the unit until after the Battle of the Little Big Horn, which occurred several weeks after his appointment.

Early military career
Due to his regiment's heavy losses, Garlington was quickly promoted to first lieutenant on June 25, 1876 and then to Regimental Adjutant June 6, 1877, and served in that post until 1881. He commanded one of the failed Adolphus Greely Relief Expeditions in 1883. On December 29, 1890, Garlington was injured while at Wounded Knee Massacre in South Dakota, and received the Medal of Honor on September 23, 1893, for distinguished gallantry.

Garlington's next promotions were to captain on December 3, 1891, and major, inspector general, on January 2, 1895. In 1898, Garlington served as inspector general in Cuba during the Spanish–American War and participated in the Battle of Santiago de Cuba. In that same year (July 7, 1898), he was promoted to lieutenant colonel. He again served as inspector general from 1899 through 1901 in the Philippines during the Philippine–American War. On March 1, 1901, Garlington was promoted to colonel. He served in the inspector general position again in the Philippines from 1905 to 1906.

The ultimate promotion for Garlington was to brigadier general, Inspector General of the Army, on October 1, 1906, after which he served on the General Staff of the Army. In 1908, he conducted the army investigation into the Brownsville Affair.

In 1911, he was an observer of the German Army Maneuvers.

World War I
He retired due to age on February 20, 1917.  However, he served in the office of the chief of staff from April 30 to September 21, 1917.

Death and legacy
Garlington died on October 16, 1934 and was buried at Arlington National Cemetery, Arlington, Virginia. His first wife, Anna Buford Garlington (1864–1954) and his daughter, Sally Garlington Chamberlin (1890–1949), are buried with him. His son, Cresswell Garlington, (1887–1945) was also a brigadier general in the United States Army and is buried in a separate plot at Arlington.

Books written by Garlington include: Historical Sketches of the Seventh Cavalry Regiment and A Catechism on Cavalry Outposts, Reconnaissance, Patrols, and Advance and Rear Guards.

Awards
 Medal of Honor
 Indian Campaign Medal
 Spanish Campaign Medal
 Philippine Campaign Medal
 Victory Medal

Medal of Honor citation
Rank and organization: first lieutenant, 7th U.S. Cavalry. Place and date: At Wounded Knee Creek, S. Dak., December 29, 1890. Entered service at: Athens, Ga. Born: February 20, 1853, Newberry, S.C. Date of issue: September 26, 1893.

Citation:

Distinguished gallantry.

See also

 List of Medal of Honor recipients
 List of Medal of Honor recipients for the Indian Wars
 Adolphus Greely
 Brownsville Affair

References

External links
  Ernest Albert Garlington at ArlingtonCemetery.net, an unofficial website
 Ernest Albert Garlington (w description of his gallantry at Wounded Knee)

1853 births
1934 deaths
Military personnel from South Carolina
American military personnel of the Philippine–American War
American military personnel of the Spanish–American War
United States Army Medal of Honor recipients
Burials at Arlington National Cemetery
Inspectors General of the United States Army
People from Newberry, South Carolina
United States Army generals
United States Military Academy alumni
University of Georgia people
Wars involving the indigenous peoples of North America
American Indian Wars recipients of the Medal of Honor
Pine Ridge Campaign
United States Army generals of World War I